Emery Tales is a 2015 Greek documentary film written and directed by Susanne Bausinger and Stelios Efstathopoulos. Set on the island of Naxos, the film illustrates the declining emery industry in an isolated and struggling mining community.

The film premiered at the Thessaloniki Documentary Festival on March 3, 2015.

Synopsis

In 2014, a group of miners try to mine as much "smyrigli", or emery, as possible in the mountain of Naxos. They are only able to mine two or three times every year. Apeiranthos, their community on the island, is dwindling due to its dwellers transferring to other more beneficial places in Greece.

Production

Emery Tales was written and directed by Susanne Bausinger and Stelios Efstathopoulos, the former being a German director. The film is a co-production of Faos TV Productions with Roll Productions, a studio founded by the film's editor.

Release
Emery Tales premiered at the Thessaloniki Documentary Festival on March 3, 2015. It was also screened at the 42 Ekotopfilm Bratislava Documentary Festival on May 29, 2015, and at the World Premieres Film Festival Philippines 2015 in the "Cine Verde" section on June 30, 2015.

References

2015 films
2015 documentary films
Documentary films about mining
Films shot in Greece
Greek documentary films